The Città di Grado Tennis Cup is a tournament for professional female tennis players played on outdoor clay courts. The event is classified as a $60,000 ITF Women's World Tennis Tour tournament and has been held in Grado, Italy, since 1998.

Past finals

Singles

Doubles

External links
 ITF search

ITF Women's World Tennis Tour
Clay court tennis tournaments
Tennis tournaments in Italy
Recurring sporting events established in 1998